Gilgit Tehsil is a tehsil in Gilgit District, Pakistan.  It contains the city of Gilgit and some villages.

The table below shows some of the villages in Gilgit tehesil.

References

Tehsils of Gilgit-Baltistan